Stephen L. Hodge is the CEO and co-founder of Toon Goggles, Inc., the Chief Marketing Director of Digital Media Interactive, and a board member for the non-profit Youth Education For Success.

Biography
Stephen L. Hodge was born and raised in Los Angeles. He is the son of Lowell Hodge. He lives in Los Angeles with his three children.

References

American chief executives
Living people
Year of birth missing (living people)